Márton Sik (born January 28, 1984) is a Hungarian sprint canoer who has competed since the mid-2000s. He won two medals in the K-4 500 m at the ICF Canoe Sprint World Championships with a silver in 2006 and a bronze in 2007.

Sik also finished fifth in the K-4 1000 m event at the 2008 Summer Olympics in Beijing.

References

Sports-reference.com profile

1981 births
Canoeists at the 2008 Summer Olympics
Hungarian male canoeists
Living people
Olympic canoeists of Hungary
ICF Canoe Sprint World Championships medalists in kayak
21st-century Hungarian people